Uptown Theatre (also known as Balaban and Katz Uptown Theatre) is a currently closed movie palace and concert venue located in the Uptown neighborhood of Chicago, Illinois. Designed by Rapp and Rapp and built by Paschen Bros. contractors, it is one of the many movie palaces built by the Balaban & Katz theatre chain run by A. J. Balaban, his brother Barney Balaban, and their partner Sam Katz.

The largest remaining in Chicago, it boasts 4,381 seats and its interior volume is said to be larger than any other movie palace in the United States, including Radio City Music Hall in New York. The mammoth theater has an ornate five-story entrance lobby, formerly with an eight-story façade.

The Uptown Theater has been closed since 1981. While restoration was often discussed in the following decades, and several concentrated efforts were made to promote the Uptown's restoration, no such efforts were successful, leaving the theater in disrepair. However, on June 28, 2018, it was announced that $75 million had been set aside to restore the theater.

History

Grand opening
The Uptown Theatre opened its doors August 18, 1925, billed as "An Acre of Seats in a Magic City." The Grand Opening of the Uptown Theatre was accompanied by a "Central Uptown Parade" of over 200 floats and a grand ball at Harmon's Arcadia in Uptown. Over 12,000 people stood in line to be ticketholders in the very first audience. Several women collapsed because of exhaustion.

Uptown Theatre staff and stage shows
The theater opened with a staff of more than 130 people, including a full-time 34 piece orchestra, a nurse, firemen and others. Elaborate stage show productions would accompany each movie, unique in that the elaborate stage shows would follow the theme of the movie. Other chains had basic Vaudeville acts to keep patrons entertained before the movie. The Uptown Theatre is on several landmark and historic registers.

A half century of movies

Movies at the Uptown Theatre continued, even after stage shows ended as a way to reduce costs. In 1949, the stage shows were revived for a short time. Movies continued during the 1950s and 1960s. Notably, during that time, the television show Queen for a Day was filmed in the Uptown, with a live audience.

Movie crowds eventually dwindled, at the same time that the Uptown area was experiencing a decline of retail in the late 1960s and early 1970s.

New life as a music venue
In the 1970s, the theater was revived as a major concert venue, hosting local and national acts, notably the Grateful Dead several times between 1978 and 1981. The J. Geils Band was the last band to play at the theater.

Since 1981 closure 
The Uptown Theatre has been closed to regular events since the winter of 1981. Then-owner Plitt Theatres had turned off the heat, causing a frozen water pipe to burst, which caused extensive damage to the interior. In subsequent years, deferred maintenance and vandalism led to further debilitation of the structure and ornament, both inside and out.

Since 1981, the theater has been used as a location for scenes in movies such as the Academy Award-nominated Ron Howard movie, Backdraft, the Julia Roberts and Nick Nolte movie, I Love Trouble, and the John Hughes-Chris Columbus sequel Home Alone 2: Lost in New York. In the 1990s, the theatre lobby was host to the "Hearts Party" (a gay "circuit" party), which raised money for an AIDS charity. In 2016, the theater was used for the music video for Regina Spektor's single "Black and White".

Current restoration efforts
In 1990, a group of preservationists persuaded the then owners to donate important interior fixtures from the Uptown, specifically to be used in future preservation and restoration projects. Through the efforts of civil engineer, Curt Mangel, it was arranged that the fixtures would be stored by wealthy collector, Jasper Sanfilippo, at his estate in Barrington Hills, Illinois.

In 2006, the exterior was extensively secured and terra cotta pieces were cataloged and stored for future restoration efforts. A May 21, 2007 article in Crain's Chicago Business described the Uptown Theatre as "suddenly a hot property," as three national entertainment companies were in competition to purchase, restore and reopen the Uptown Theatre.

The theater was purchased through a judicial sale July 29, 2008 by JAM Productions for $3.2 million and finalized in court on August 18, 2008. It is estimated it will take about $70 million to restore. JAM currently also owns the Riviera Theatre also on Broadway, approximately one block away.

In August 2013, the fourth installment of the Transformers series had begun filming scenes in the theatre.

On June 28, 2018, it was announced that $75 million had been set aside to restore the theater. Construction was expected to begin during the summer of 2019.

Preservation advocacy
A diverse advocacy group of friends, neighbors, historians, and theatre enthusiasts, Friends of the Uptown, founded in 1998, supports restoring the venue to its position as an entertainment and economic asset for the Uptown neighborhood. A 2006 documentary by filmmakers John Pappas and Michael Bisberg, Uptown: Portrait of a Palace, published by Compass Rose, explores the history of the Uptown Theatre and why the largest and one of the most elaborate theatres in the nation has been left vacant since 1981. Historic photos are juxtaposed with recent film footage to show how the building has survived the past 80 years. The documentary uses interviews with eight sources close to the theatre, including Alderman Mary Ann Smith; local business owner Ric Addy; Rene Rabiella, whose father once owned the theatre; Andy Pierce, volunteer and founding member of Friends of the Uptown; Bob Boin, a volunteer engineer; Dave Syfczak, caretaker; Joanne Asala and Robert Calhoun, theatre activists and co-founders of a history Web site; and Joseph DuciBella, founding member of the Theatre Historical Society and author of Theatres of Chicago, to highlight the plight of historic architecture across the country. The film premiered at the Portage Theatre in Chicago in June 2006 and has been featured on WTTW, Chicago's public television station. Uptown: Portrait of a Palace won in the "Best Documentary" category at the 11th Annual Flicker Fest.

The preservation group Landmarks Illinois named the Uptown Theatre on their list of "Ten Most Endangered Historic Places" in 1996, 2001, 2010, and 2014.

Literature
The Uptown Theatre is featured on the cover of a book entitled The Chicago Movie Palaces of Balaban and Katz by David Balaban, published by Arcadia Publishing.

Notable performers

 Larry Adler
 The Allman Brothers Band
 Average White Band
 Count Basie
 Boston
 Peabo Bryson
 Alice Cooper
 Elvis Costello
 Bing Crosby
 Cheap Trick
 Cheech & Chong
 Charlie Daniels Band
 Dire Straits
 Electric Light Orchestra
 Duke Ellington
 Ruth Etting
 Foreigner
 Peter Gabriel
 Jerry Garcia Band
 Judy Garland
 Genesis
 Gentle Giant
 Benny Goodman
 Grateful Dead
 Hall & Oates
 J. Geils Band
 Rick James
 Kansas
 The Kinks
 The Knack
 Bob Marley & The Wailers
 Steve Miller Band
 Graham Parker
 Prince
 The Ramones
 Lou Reed
 Renaissance
 Roxy Music
 Todd Rundgren
 Leon Russell
 Santana
 Sister Sledge
 Southside Johnny & The Asbury Jukes
 Bruce Springsteen & the E Street Band
 Rod Stewart
 Squeeze
 Supertramp
 Thin Lizzy
 The Tubes
 The Marshall Tucker Band
 Paul Whiteman
 Frank Zappa

References

External links

 Friends of the Uptown – Group dedicated to re-opening the Uptown Theatre
 Compass Rose Cultural Crossroads – Has an extensive history of the Uptown Theatre.
 Uptown: Portrait of a Palace (2006), a film by John Pappas

Chicago Landmarks
Movie palaces
Theatres completed in 1925
Theatres in Chicago
Theatres on the National Register of Historic Places in Chicago
1925 establishments in Illinois